Ab Garmeh (also Romanized as Āb Garmeh) is a village in Dasht-e Lali Rural District, in the Central District of Lali County, Khuzestan Province, Iran. In 2006, its population was 60, in 7 total families.

References 

Populated places in Lali County